Last Hour is a 2008 straight-to-DVD American crime drama film starring DMX, Michael Madsen, David Carradine and Paul Sorvino.

Plot
The film follows five characters who are lured to an abandoned house in China by letters they all received from their fathers. They soon realize they are not alone and there is one other man in the house with them. Once they start uncovering the secrets, they begin to solve the mystery.

Cast
 DMX as Jack "Black Jack"
 Michael Madsen as Monk
 David Carradine as Detective Mike Stone
 Paul Sorvino as Maitre Steinfeld
 Kwong Leung Wong as Shang (Tommy Wong)
 Morgan Benoit as Young FBI Agent
 Tony D'Amario as "Casino"
 Mónica Cruz as Detective Rosa Mulero
 Karl Eiselen as Ron Stanax (Karl Eiselan)
 Pascal Caubet as "Poker" (Kobe)
 Steven Eng as Detective Huang
 Krystyna Ferentz as "Poison" (Bettina Antoni)

External links

2008 films
2008 crime drama films
American crime drama films
2000s English-language films
2000s American films